Chen Ying-git is a female singer of Taiwanese Hakka heritage. She has produced albums from the 1980s through the 1990s like another singer, Jody Chiang. One of her famous songs is 海海人生. She also sang a famous duet called 酒醉黑白話 with Taiwanese male singer Yu Tian.

References

Living people
Hakka musicians
Taiwanese Buddhists
Taiwanese people of Hakka descent
Taiwanese women singers
Taiwanese Hokkien pop singers
People from Hsinchu County
Year of birth missing (living people)